André Petit (11 September 1921 – 20 July 2021) was a French politician.

Biography
Petit served as Mayor of Eaubonne from 1965 to 2001. As Mayor, he formed a sister-city bond between Eaubonne and Budenheim in Germany. A member of the Union for French Democracy, he served in the National Assembly for Val d'Oise from 1978 to 1981.

André Petit died in Eaubonne on 20 July 2021 at the age of 99.

References

1921 births
2021 deaths
20th-century French politicians
21st-century French politicians
French general councillors
Deputies of the 6th National Assembly of the French Fifth Republic
Mayors of places in Île-de-France
Union for French Democracy politicians
People from Cher (department)